Beneš (feminine Benešová) is a common Czech and Slovak surname. The surname was derived from the shortened Czech form of the given name Benedict (Latin name of meaning "blessed", see also the surname Benedict). In the old Czech orthography the word was written as Beness, the Germanized form is Benesch.

Notable people with the surname include:

 Alan Benes (born 1972), American Major League Baseball pitcher
 Andy Benes (born 1967), American Major League Baseball pitcher
 Bedřich Beneš (born 1967), Czech-American computer scientist
 Božena Benešová (1873–1936), Czech poet and author
 Edvard Beneš (1884–1948), leader of the Czechoslovak independence movement and the second President of Czechoslovakia
 Emilie Benes Brzezinski (born 1932), American sculptor and widow of Zbigniew Brzezinski
 Hana Benešová, Czech athlete
 Ivan Beneš, Czech basketball player and coach
 Iveta Benešová (born 1983), Czech professional tennis player
 Jan Beneš  (1936–2007), Czech writer, translator, publicist and screenwriter
 Jan Beneš (born 1987), Czech orienteering junior world champion
 Joan Benesh (1920–2014), British ballet dancer
 Josef Beneš (1902–1984), Czech linguist
 Juraj Beneš (1940–2004), Slovak opera and orchestral composer
 Ladislav Beneš (born 1943) Czech handball player
 Libuše Benešová, Czech politician
 Lubomír Beneš (1935–1995) Czech animator, director and author
 Luděk Beneš Czechoslovak slalom canoer
  (born 1960), Czech animator who worked in Pat and Mat, and Club of the Discarded (1989)
 Marie Benešová, Czech politician
 Marijan Beneš (born 1951), Yugoslav boxer
 Pavel Beneš chief designer at ČKD-Prague
 Petr Beneš, Czech volleyball player
 Rudolf Benesh (1916–1975), British mathematician, co-inventor of Benesh Movement Notation
 Svatopluk Beneš, (1918–2007), Czech actor
 Thomas A. Benes, (1951–2014) United States Marine Corps general
 Václav Beneš Třebízský (1849–1884) Czech novelist
 Vaclav E. Benes (born 1931), American mathematician, developer of the Benes network
 Vít Beneš, Czech association footballer
 Vojta Beneš (1878–1951), Czechoslovak educator and political leader, brother of Edvard Beneš

Fictional characters:

 Alton Benes, Elaine Benes's father on Seinfeld
 Elaine Benes, Julia Louis-Dreyfus' character on Seinfeld
 Jan Benes, the comatose scientist in Fantastic Voyage portrayed by Jean Del Val
 Sandra Benes, a character on Space: 1999

See also 

 Beneš-Mráz
 Beneš decrees, a series of laws enacted by the Czechoslovak government of exile during World War II in absence of Czechoslovak parliament
 Benes network, a type of switching network used in telecommunications
 Benesch (a Germanized form of the name)

Czech-language surnames
Slavic-language surnames